WMRN-FM is a country music radio station in Marion, Ohio, currently owned by iHeartMedia.

Station history
The previous WMRN-FM had served the nearby Marion, Ohio area at 106.9 MHz with a country music format under the on-air monikers “FM-107”, “Country 107”, “Hot Country 107” and "Buckeye Country 107" over the previous years.

The country format moved to 94.3 MHz, where the WMRN-FM call letters were moved to on 1/6/2008. The original WMRN-FM (106.9) moved to the Columbus market as WRXS.

94.3 FM was previously WDIF, and had served Marion since 1975 with an adult-oriented format. Originally owned by Scantland Communications, who also owned WQEL-FM (92.7 Bucyrus, Ohio), featured an eclectic format of soft jazz and adult contemporary hits as well as newscasts produced by a 3-person news department. The call letters reflected the station's slogan, "WDIF Makes a Difference." In the late 1970s, the radio trade publication Radio and Records named WDIF "Best Small Market Station in America."  By 1982, WDIF was named "Best Small Market Station" in the country by Billboard magazine.  Scantland would sell WDIF-FM to Burbach Broadcasting in 1994 who owned WMRN-AM and WMRN-FM 106.9 in Marion, Ohio, WBUK-FM (106.3, Ottawa, Ohio) and WPFX-FM (107.7, North Baltimore, Ohio). Burbach Broadcasting owned several other radio stations in Clarksburg, West Virginia, Parkersburg, West Virginia and State College, Pennsylvania.

In 1996, Ohio Radio Group purchased WQEL and WBCO in nearby Bucyrus from former owner Scantland Communications becoming a local radio powerhouse owning several stations, including WFXN-FM (102.3, Galion, Ohio), WMAN-FM (98.3, Fredericktown, Ohio)and WXXF (107.7 Loudonville, Ohio). In 1996, WYNT which was based in nearby Upper Sandusky, Ohio were also added making Ohio Radio Group the largest radio ownership company in Ohio. The company also tried to purchase WMRN-AM, WDIF-FM, WMRN-FM, WBUK-FM and WPFX-FM but the sale was not approved by the Department of Justice because of ownership limits in the concentrated Mid-Ohio market. Burbach then sold the stations to Randy Michaels-led Jacor Communications, based in Cincinnati, Ohio.

Before WMRN-FM's move to 94.3 FM, WDIF had been known as "Mix 94.3."

References

External links
WMRN-FM website

MRN
IHeartMedia radio stations